The 1953–54 season was the 46th year of football played by Dundee United, and covers the period from 1 July 1953 to 30 June 1954. United finished in fifteenth place in the Second Division.

Match results
Dundee United played a total of 37 competitive matches during the 1953–54 season.

Legend

All results are written with Dundee United's score first.
Own goals in italics

Division B

Scottish Cup

League Cup

See also
 1953–54 in Scottish football

References

Dundee United F.C. seasons
Dundee United